The 1999 Colorado Buffaloes football team represented the University of Colorado at Boulder during the 1999 NCAA Division I-A football season. The team played their home games at Folsom Field in Boulder, Colorado. They participated in the Big 12 Conference in the North Division. They were coached by head coach Gary Barnett.

Schedule

Rankings

Roster

Game summaries

Oklahoma

Source: USA Today

References

Colorado
Colorado Buffaloes football seasons
Guaranteed Rate Bowl champion seasons
Colorado Buffaloes football